The Army Air Defence College, (abbreviated as AADC), is the training academy for the Army Air Defence Corps of Indian Army. The college is located in the Gopalpur Military Station in Gopalpur, Odisha. It spreads over an area of 2700 acres of land. The primary objective of the academy is to impart technical and operational knowledge to the personnel of Indian Army posted to the Corps of Army Air Defence (AAD) about the air defence systems and anti-aircraft warfare. Besides the army personnel, the academy also trains personnel from navy, air force and officers from friendly foreign nations.

The history of the academy dates back to mid 1940s when anti-aircraft training battery was established by the British in July 1940 at Karachi (now Pakistan) to train the troops deputed to the newly established air defence artillery. Post-independence Air Defence & Guided Missile School and Centre was established at Gopalpur. The school was later renamed as 'Army Air Defence College (AADC)' in 1998. The academy enjoyed autonomy after the splitting of the Corps of Army Air Defence from the Regiment of Artillery. In 2008, the Army Air Defence Centre was also merged into this academy.

Infrastructural facilities of the academy include simulators several missile systems used by corps and seaward firing ranges about 75 km. The campus has facilities for sports and adventure activities such as sailing, water skiing, rowing and para sailing.

History

Pre-independence

In July 1940, government established training schools for anti-aircraft and coastal defence wings at Karachi. These schools predominantly trained the Indian personnel including commissioned, junior commissioned and non-commissioned officers in anti-aircraft warfare. Unlike the Coastal Artillery School (CAS), which was moved to Deolali, the anti-aircraft training school continued at Karachi till 1947.

Post-independence
Following the independence in August 1947, the training school was moved and merged into the air defence wing of School of Artillery in Deolali. Initially ten courses were proposed for training at different stages in anti-aircraft warfare.

In 1955, Due to lack of facilities and firing ranges available for firing of missiles and other air defence weapon systems, it was proposed to relocate the wing. After the approval of setting up the academy in the 3000 acres of land given by the Government of Orissa in 1968, the government authorized the establishment of Air Defence & Guided Missile School and Centre in 1979. On 1 November 1989, the Air Defence & Guided Missile School and Centre was formally inaugurated as a part of Gopalpur military cantonment.

After the bifurcation of 'Corps of Air Defence Artillery' (later Corps of Army Air Defence) from the Regiment of Artillery in 1994, the college was awarded autonomous status from 10 January 1994.

The 'Air Defence & Guided Missile School and Centre' was rechristened as 'Army Air Defence College' (AADC) in 1998. Later in 2008, the Army Air Defence Centre was also relocated to Army Air Defence College.

Infrastructure 
The college is equipped with several types of simulators, coordinate remote viewers, working models, cut sections and actual parts of the different types of radars, guns, artillery, missile and air defence systems used by the corps. These include ZSU-23-4B "Shilka", Tunguska Gun Missile System, L/70 Gun Systems, Zu 23 mm gun systems, 9K33 Osa and its variants and the ingeniously developed Akash surface-to-air missile. Besides these, the college holds a computer and electronic lab, combat simulator room and control complexes etc.

Apart from these the college has a library (known as 'Nalanda Library'), an auditorium ( known as 'AIMA Auditorium') and a lake for different aqua and sailing activities and adventure sports.

Gopalpur seaward firing ranges 

The college hosts a seaward firing range, known as Gopalpur seaward firing ranges with a range about 75 km, to give the personnel practical knowledge about the air defence systems and missile firing. This range can be used for all types of Indian Army air defence systems. The ingenuously developed pilot-less target aircraft: DRDO Lakshya, is used as the target drone.

Commandants 
The Commandant of Army Air Defence College is the head of the academy. The inaugural holder is Major General Y R Jetley, VSM. Initially the position was held by a two-star general and later it was elevated to the rank of three-star general. The present commandant is Lt Gen U V Talur, VSM.

Mishaps and accidents
In November 2014, three officers all of captain rank, 1JCO and 1 non commissioned officer have been injured seriously during a regular firing practice at the firing ranges. The injured personnel were moved to Kolkata for treatment. Army has ordered for an inquiry regarding the mishap.

References

Military academies of India
Air defence units and formations